Johan Linnander is a Swedish professional ice hockey centre who currently plays for HV71 of the Elitserien.

References

Living people
HV71 players
Year of birth missing (living people)
Swedish ice hockey centres